The Beipan River Guanxing Highway Bridge or Beipanjiang River 2003 Bridge is a 366-metre-high suspension bridge on the Guanxing Highway near Xingbei Town (Xinbeizhen), Zhenfeng County, Guizhou Province, China. The bridge has a span length of 388 metres. When it opened in 2003, it was the world's highest bridge, and it held that title until the opening of the Hegigio Gorge Pipeline Bridge in 2005.

Height
When the bridge was completed in 2003 it was the highest in the world, sitting 366 metres above the Beipan River. The bridge became the second Chinese span in two years to take the record. The first was the Liuguanghe Bridge in 2001. In 2009 a dam was constructed downstream from the bridge, reducing the drop to the water slightly.

The bridge is also the second of three Beipan River crossings to have been among the world's ten highest. The first was the  Beipanjiang River Railway Bridge, which opened in 2001 and was the highest train bridge in the world until 2016 when China's Najiehe Railway Bridge and Qinglong Railway Bridge were opened. The Beipan River Hukun Expressway Bridge, the third bridge to cross high above the Beipanjiang, opened in 2009 on the Guiyang-to-Kunming Highway with a suspension span 1,083 feet (330 m) above the river.

See also
 List of highest bridges in the world

References

External links

 on HighestBridges.com
北盘江大桥 (Beipanjiang Bridge) 

Suspension bridges in China
Bridges in Guizhou
Road bridges in China
Bridges completed in 2003
2003 establishments in China
Bridges over the Beipan River